The 1977 WANFL season was the 93rd season of the Western Australian National Football League in its various incarnations. It followed on from the previous season's high scoring to set another record for the highest average score in WANFL history at 109.57 points per team per game, which was to be broken substantially in the following few years due to the introduction of the interchange rule allowing for a faster game with less exhausted players. 1977 was in fact that last WA(N)FL season with no score of over 200 points until 1988.

The season saw  win their second consecutive premiership with a resounding win and record WA(N)FL Grand Final score over  who were in the finals for the first time since their last premiership in 1974. It was the fifth premiership in twelve seasons for the Demons, and their last as of 2022: Perth have not played in a Grand Final since 1978, and did even not qualify for the finals between 1997 and 2020.

To counter the uneven quality of inter-league matches between the WANFL and the VFL due to recruiting of top interstate players by Victoria, a State of Origin match was held in Perth the week following the Grand Final. Western Australia showed its quality as a developer of Australian Rules talent with a crushing 94-point win over the best players bred in Victoria, and until the advent of the national competition and the West Coast Eagles State of Origin football, this proved very popular with Western Australian and South Australian crowds and television in Victoria. However, after that it declined to the point of being abandoned after 1999.

Home-and-away season

Round 1 (Easter weekend)

Round 2

Round 3

Round 4

Round 5

Round 6

Round 7

Round 8

Round 9

Round 10

Round 11 (Foundation Day)

Round 12

Round 13

Round 14

Round 15

Round 16

Round 17

Round 18

Round 19

Round 20

Round 21

Ladder

Finals

First semi-final

Second semi-final

Preliminary final

Grand Final

State of Origin match

References

External links
Official WAFL website
Western Australian National Football League (WANFL), 1977

West Australian Football League seasons
WANFL